The 1969–70 Scottish League Cup final was played on 25 October 1969 at Hampden Park in Glasgow and was the final of the 24th Scottish League Cup competition. The final was contested by St Johnstone, who were contesting their first major national cup final, and cup holders Celtic. Celtic retained the cup for another year by winning the match 1–0, with Bertie Auld scoring the only goal.

Match details

References

External links
 Soccerbase

1969 10
League Cup Final
Scottish League Cup Final 1969 10
Scottish League Cup Final 1969 10
1960s in Glasgow